Sabatinca perveta is an extinct species of moth belonging to the family Micropterigidae. It is known only from the single type specimen, which has been found in Burmese amber in present-day Myanmar. It dates to the earliest Cenomanian, around 99 mya.

References

†
Fossil Lepidoptera
Eocene insects
Oligocene insects
Prehistoric insects of Asia
Burmese amber
Fossils of Myanmar
Taxa named by Theodore Dru Alison Cockerell